DoomDooma College, established in 1967, is a general degree college situated at Rupai Siding, in Tinsukia district, Assam. This college is affiliated with the Dibrugarh University.

Departments

Arts
Assamese
Hindi
English
Bangla
History
Education
Economics
Political Science

Science
Physics
Mathematics
Chemistry
Botany
Zoology

Commerce
Business Communication and Business Environment
Business Regulatory Framework
Business Environment
Financial Accounting
Corporate Accounting
Principles of Business Management
Cost Accounting and Company Law
Indian Banking System
International Business

Courses
 (IGNOU)
 (KKHSOU)

Career Oriented courses

Certificate course in Spoken English: The department of English offers a self-designed, Self-financed Certificate course for Spoken English to the students of the institution.
Certificate/Diploma courses Computer Application: The College offers self-financed certificate and DCA.
Professional course
Certificate course in Beauty Parlouring.
Certificate course in Cutting, Sewing & Embroidery.
Certificate course in Motor Driving course (with the academic and technical support of NETAI).

Facilities
Library
NCC
NSS
Career Counselling
Boys Hostels
Girls Hostel
New Girls Hostel
Gymnasium
Playground
Basketball Playground

References

External links
http://doomdoomacollege.edu.in/

Universities and colleges in Assam
Colleges affiliated to Dibrugarh University
Educational institutions established in 1967
1967 establishments in Assam